Ray Hamilton (born October 28, 1992) is an American football tight end who is currently a free agent. He played college football at University of Iowa. He signed as an undrafted free agent with the Dallas Cowboys in 2015.

Professional career

Dallas Cowboys
After going unselected in the 2015 NFL Draft, Hamilton signed as with the Dallas Cowboys on May 10, 2015. On August 4, Hamilton was waived by the Cowboys.

Pittsburgh Steelers
On August 6, 2015, Hamilton was claimed off waivers by the Pittsburgh Steelers. He was waive/injured by the team on August 31.

Washington Redskins
Hamilton signed with the Washington Redskins' practice squad on December 16, 2015. He was placed on the practice squad/injured list on December 21.

References

External links
Iowa Hawkeyes bio
Pittsburgh Steelers bio

1992 births
Living people
People from Strongsville, Ohio
American football tight ends
Iowa Hawkeyes football players
Dallas Cowboys players
Pittsburgh Steelers players
Washington Redskins players
Players of American football from Ohio